Herti, or HERTI, may refer to:

 BAE Systems HERTI, an unmanned aerial vehicle developed by the British company BAE Systems
 Herti, Schwyz, a village in the municipality of Unteriberg, Schwyz, Switzerland